Tribune Publishing Company (briefly Tronc, Inc.) is an American newspaper print and online media publishing company. The company, which was acquired by Alden Global Capital in May 2021, has a portfolio that includes the Chicago Tribune, the New York Daily News, The Baltimore Sun, the Orlando Sentinel, South Florida's Sun-Sentinel, The Virginian-Pilot, the Hartford Courant,  additional titles in Pennsylvania and Virginia, syndication operations, and websites. It also publishes several local newspapers in its metropolitan regions, which are organized in subsidiary groups.

Incorporated in 1847 with the founding of the Chicago Tribune, Tribune Publishing operated as a division of the Tribune Company, a Chicago-based multimedia conglomerate, until it was spun off into a separate public company in August 2014.

The company confirmed its sale to hedge fund Alden Global Capital on May 21, 2021. The transaction officially closed on May 25. Prior to this acquisition, Tribune Publishing was the nation's third-largest newspaper publisher (behind Gannett and The McClatchy Company), with eleven daily newspapers and commuter tabloids throughout the United States. With the acquisition, Alden Global Capital became the second-largest newspaper publisher in the United States.

History

Early history
Tribune Publishing's history dates back to 1847,  when the Chicago Tribune (for which the company and its former parent, Tribune Media, are named) published its first edition on June 10 of that year, in a one-room plant at LaSalle and Lake Streets in Chicago. The Tribune constructed its first building, a four-story structure at Dearborn and Madison Streets, in 1869; however the building was destroyed, along with most of the city, by the Great Chicago Fire in October 1871. The Tribune resumed printing two days later with an editorial declaring "Chicago Shall Rise Again". The newspaper's editor and part-owner, Joseph Medill, was elected mayor and led the city's reconstruction. A native Ohioan who first acquired an interest in the Tribune in 1855, Medill gained full control of the newspaper in 1874 and ran it until his death in 1899.

Medill's two grandsons, cousins Robert R. McCormick and Joseph Medill Patterson, assumed leadership of the company in 1911. That same year, the Chicago Tribunes first newsprint mill opened in Thorold, Ontario, Canada. The mill marked the beginnings of the Canadian newsprint producer later known as QUNO, in which Tribune held an investment interest until 1995. The Chicago Tribune-New York News Syndicate was formed in 1918, leading to Joseph Patterson's establishment of the company's second newspaper, the New York Daily News on June 26, 1919. Tribune's ownership of the New York City tabloid was considered "interlocking" due to an agreement between McCormick and Patterson.

Expansion
The company acquired the Fort Lauderdale-based Sun-Sentinel newspaper in 1963; this was later followed by its purchase of the Orlando Sentinel in 1965. In 1973, the company began sharing stories among 25 subscriber newspapers via the newly formed news service, the Knight News Wire. By 1990, this service was known as Knight-Ridder/Tribune and provided graphics, photo, and news content to its member newspapers. KRT became McClatchy-Tribune Information Services, which is owned by the Tribune Company and McClatchy, when The McClatchy Company purchased Knight-Ridder Inc. in 2006. Tribune later acquired the Newport News, Virginia-based Daily Press in 1986. In the wake of a dispute with some of its labor unions, the New York Daily News was sold to British businessman Robert Maxwell in 1991.

In June 2000, Tribune acquired the Los Angeles-based Times Mirror Company in a merger deal worth $8.3 billion, which was the largest acquisition in the history of the newspaper industry. The merger added seven daily newspapers to Tribune's portfolio, including the Los Angeles Times, the Long Island-based Newsday, The Baltimore Sun, and the Hartford Courant. Tribune Media Net, the national advertising sales organization of Tribune Publishing, was established in 2000 to take advantage of the company's expanded scale and scope.

Later in the decade, Tribune launched daily newspapers targeting urban commuters, including the Chicago Tribune RedEye edition in 2002, followed by an investment in AM New York one year later. In 2006, Tribune acquired the minority equity interest in AM New York, giving it full ownership of the newspaper. The company sold both Newsday and AM New York to Cablevision Systems Corporation in 2008, with the sale of the latter paper closing on July 29 of that year.

Takeover by Sam Zell and bankruptcy
On April 2, 2007, Chicago-based investor Sam Zell announced plans to buy out the Tribune Company for $34.00 a share, totaling $8.2 billion, with intentions to take the company private. The deal was approved by 97% of the company's shareholders on August 21, 2007. Privatization of the Tribune Company occurred on December 20, 2007, with Tribune's stock listing being terminated at the close of the trading day.

On December 8, 2008, faced with a high debt load totaling $13 billion, related to the company's leveraged buyout and subsequent privatization, and a sharp downturn in newspaper advertising revenue, Tribune filed for Chapter 11 bankruptcy protection in what was the largest bankruptcy in the history of the American media industry. Company plans called for it to emerge from bankruptcy by May 31, 2010, but the company would end up in protracted bankruptcy proceedings for four years.

On July 13, 2012, the Tribune Company received approval of a reorganization plan to allow the company to emerge from Chapter 11 bankruptcy protection in a Delaware bankruptcy court. Oaktree Capital Management, JPMorgan Chase and Angelo, Gordon & Co., which were the company's senior debt holders, assumed control of Tribune's properties upon the company's exit from bankruptcy on December 31, 2012.

Spin-off of publishing unit
On February 26, 2013, Tribune reportedly hired investment firms Evercore Partners and J.P. Morgan & Co. to oversee the sale of its newspapers. On July 10, 2013, Tribune announced that it would split into two companies, spinning off its publishing division into the Tribune Publishing Company. Its broadcasting, digital media and other assets (including GraceNote) would remain with the Tribune Company. On November 20, 2013, Tribune announced it would cut 700 jobs from its newspaper properties due to declining advertising revenues.

On June 17, 2014, in a presentation for lenders, Tribune revealed that it had set August 4 as the target date for its spin-off of Tribune Publishing. The split was finalized on the target date, with the publishing arm being spun out as Tribune Publishing Company, and its former parent company being renamed Tribune Media.

Post spin-off 
Tribune Publishing acquired six suburban daily and 32 weekly newspapers in the Chicago Metropolitan Area in October 2014. These acquisitions were similar in strategy to earlier acquisitions in the state of Maryland, expanding its footprint in its eight "core markets".

On May 7, 2015, Tribune Publishing announced that it had reached a deal to acquire the San Diego Union-Tribune and its associated properties for $85 million, ending the paper's 146 years of private ownership. Following the completion of the acquisition, the Union-Tribune and the Los Angeles Times became part of a new operating entity known as the California News Group, led by Times publisher and CEO Timothy E. Ryan. The two California papers retained distinct operations, but sought a synergy with content sharing between them.

In April 2016, Gannett Company (which, much like Tribune, had spun out its broadcasting properties into a separate firm to focus on publishing assets) made an unsolicited bid to acquire Tribune Publishing for $12.25 per-share, or around $400 million. This deal was rejected by Tribune's shareholders in May 2016; in turn, Gannett increased its offer to around $15 per-share (around $800 million). On May 17, 2016, Tribune chairman Michael Ferro stated that he intended to make a bid to acquire Gannett instead.

On November 1, 2016, Gannett announced that it would no longer pursue its acquisition of Tronc.

tronc era

On June 2, 2016, the company announced that it would rebrand itself as tronc, short for "Tribune online content". The rebranding took place on June 20, 2016. Tronc began trading on NASDAQ under the symbol TRNC. In June 2018, the Tribune Company announced that it would no longer be referred to as Tronc and would instead henceforth be called "Tribune Publishing".

At the time in 2016 that the company moved into calling itself tronc, chief technology officer Malcolm CasSelle and chief digital officer Anne Vasquez announced to employees initiatives in content optimization, machine learning, artificial intelligence, and increasing the amount of video to 50% of all content by 2017, in an effort to increase reader engagement and ad revenue. The company also introduced a new slogan, From Pixels to Pulitzers. The video announcement was derided in social and print media as full of buzzwords and lacking substance. On August 7, 2016, while criticising several aspects of a corporate restructuring that went along with the rebranding (for instance a shift of focus away from hard news towards usage maximization, which he perceived as undue), satirist John Oliver mocked this new name as "the sound an ejaculating elephant makes", and (ironically) "the sound of a stack of newspapers hitting a dumpster." The Verge said, "Sounds like a Millennial falling down the stairs."

On March 13, 2017, tronc announced that it would license Arc, the content management system of The Washington Post.

On September 4, 2017, tronc announced that it had acquired the New York Daily News. Having been established in 1919 by the Chicago Tribune-New York News Syndicate, the Daily News had been owned by the Tribune Company before its sale to Robert Maxwell in 1991 and then to Mortimer Zuckerman in 1993. Tronc purchased the New York Daily News for $1 plus the assumption of its liabilities. On July 23, 2018, tronc announced massive layoffs at the paper, and ousted its editor in chief.

On February 7, 2018, tronc announced the sale of its California properties (Los Angeles Times, San Diego Union-Tribune) to Patrick Soon-Shiong for $500 million, with the buyer also assuming of $90 million in pension liabilities. The sale closed on June 18 that year and Tribune Publishing announced at the time that it would no longer be referred to as tronc.

Tribune Publishing 

On June 19, 2018, it was reported that tronc would revert its name back to Tribune Publishing; this would be confirmed by the company in October of that year. In July 2018 tronc moved their headquarters from Tribune Tower several blocks south to One Prudential Plaza.

In January 2019, Tribune announced that industry veteran Timothy P. Knight would succeed Justin Dearborn as CEO. Dearborn had served as CEO since 2016. The company's board of directors also elected former Congressman and chairman of the House Rules Committee David Dreier to succeed Dearborn as chairman.

In December 2019, Alden Global Capital, a New York City-based hedge fund, acquired a 32% stake in shares of Tribune Publishing Company.

In February 2020, Dreier and Knight stepped down as chairman and CEO, respectively.  Knight was replaced by the chief financial officer, Terry Jimenez.

In 2020, during the COVID-19 pandemic, Tribune Publishing closed a number of its papers' newsrooms, including those of: the New York Daily News, The Morning Call, the Orlando Sentinel, the Carroll County Times, the Capital Gazette and the Hartford Courant.

Acquisition by Alden Global 

Tribune Publishing was acquired by hedge fund Alden Global Capital for $635 million, giving its final approval on May 21, 2021, with the transaction officially closing on May 25, 2021.

In December 2019, Alden acquired a 32% stake in shares of Tribune Publishing Company. Most of its stake was purchased from Michael Ferro at $13 a share. Considering what it paid for other tranches, the average price Alden Global paid for its shares of Tribune Publishing stock is around $12.75. It is offering $17.25/share. Tribune Publishing announced in February 2021 that it had agreed to be wholly acquired by Alden Global Capital, and the final approval came in May.

A key element in concluding the sale to Alden was the decision by Patrick Soon-Shiong, who owned 24% of the company's stock, to abstain from the May 21 shareholder vote.

In early April 2021, Tribune Publishing announced that it has entered into serious discussions with an alternative pair of suitors for an amount higher than its deal with Alden. The new bidders were Stewart W. Bainum Jr. and Hansjörg Wyss. This deal would have amounted to an overall bid of $680 million, or $18.50/share, in contrast to the $635 million offer from Alden Global.

The Bainum/Wyss acquisition offer came about when Bainum's offer to purchase the Baltimore Sun from Alden Global Capital once it completed its acquisition of Tribune Publishing fell apart. The Baltimore Sun deal fell apart on March 12 when Bainum became convinced that Alden was smuggling extra costs and fees into its deal with him that violated what he thought he had agreed to. He had agreed to purchase the Sun for $65 million, along with payments on a transitional-services agreement. The transitional-services agreement would have involved payments from the Sun to Alden Global Capital for logistical aspects of running the business including its payroll and circulation departments and national and digital sales unit. Bainum believed he had negotiated a deal for two years of transitional services, with a 30-day exit clause. Instead, he was asked to commit to a five-year agreement with no possibility of an early exit. Bainum took umbrage and, instead, put together a competing bid to purchase the entirety of Tribune Publishing.

Poynter.org observed that fears about the potential Alden Global Capital acquisition may have obscured that staffing levels at Tribune Publishing's nine metropolitan newspapers fell 30.4% from 2019 to 2020. They write, "Employees and local readers are concerned that Alden would make deep cuts to Tribune if it bought the company. But it seems that's already happening."

Hansjörg Wyss announced the third week of April that he was withdrawing from acquisition talks. Shortly thereafter, Tribune Publishing said that it was ending its conversations with Stewart W. Bainum Jr. because they believed that this possible deal could not reasonably be expected, in the absence of Wyss, to lead to a "superior proposal". Wyss had been expected to contribute $505 million to the transaction, with $100 million coming from Bainum.

Bainum had until the end of the first week in May to submit a better proposal. Tribune Publishing's shareholders voted on a final deal on May 21. Bainum's difficulty in putting together a deal was said to be his inability to find a purchaser for the Chicago Tribune, which is the largest and most expensive of the metropolitan daily newspapers owned by Tribune Publishing. In the wake of the May 21 finalized sale, Bainum expressed continued interest in purchasing the Baltimore Sun and indicated that if he is unable to do so, he might invest a significant sum in creating a digital alternative.

Publications owned

Current

Newspapers
 Chicago Tribune (Chicago, Illinois)
 Daily Southtown (Chicago, Illinois)
 Post-Tribune (Merrillville, Indiana)
 Naperville Sun (Naperville, Illinois)
 Elgin Courier-News (Elgin, Illinois)
 The Beacon-News (Aurora, Illinois)
 Lake County News-Sun (Gurnee, Illinois)
 Pioneer Press
 Barrington Courier-Review
 Buffalo Grove Countryside
 Deerfield Review 
 The Doings Clarendon Hills
 The Doings Hinsdale
 The Doings La Grange
 The Doings Oak Brook
 The Doings Weekly
 The Doings Western Springs
 Elm Leaves
 Evanston Review
 Forest Leaves
 Franklin Park Herald Journal
 Glencoe News
 Glenview Announcements
 Highland Park News
 Lake Forester
 Lake Zurich Courier
 Libertyville Review
 Lincolnshire Review
 Lincolnwood Review
 Morton Grove Champion
 Mundelein Review
 Niles Herald-Spectator
 Norridge Harwood Heights News
 Northbrook Star
 Oak Leaves
 Park Ridge Herald Advocate
 Skokie Review
 Vernon Hills Review
 Wilmette Life
 Winnetka Talk
 The Capital fka Capital Gazette (Annapolis, Maryland)
 Maryland Gazette
 Bowie Blade (Bowie, Maryland)
 Crofton-West County Gazette (Crofton, Maryland)
 Baltimore Sun (Baltimore, Maryland)
 Carroll County Times (Westminster, Maryland)
 Sun-Sentinel (Fort Lauderdale, Florida)
 Boca Times (Boca Raton, Florida; Highland Beach, Florida)
 El Sentinel del Sur de la Florida (Fort Lauderdale, Florida)
 Florida Jewish Journal
 Delray Sun (Delray Beach, Florida; Gulf Stream, Florida)
 Gateway Gazette (Boynton Beach, Florida; Lantana, Florida; Hypoluxo, Florida; Atlantis, Florida; South Palm Beach, Florida; Ocean Ridge, Florida; Manalapan, Florida; Briny Breezes, Florida)
 Glades Gazette (Miramar, Florida; Pembroke Pines, Florida; Weston, Florida; Southwest Ranches, Florida)
 Pier Review (Deerfield Beach, Florida; Pompano Beach, Florida; Lighthouse Point, Florida; Hillsboro Beach, Florida)
 Riverside Times (Fort Lauderdale, Florida; Oakland Park, Florida; Wilton Manors, Florida; Lauderdale-by-the-Sea, Florida; Sea Ranch Lakes, Florida)
 Sawgrass Sun (Plantation, Florida; Sunrise, Florida; Lauderhill, Florida; Tamarac, Florida; North Lauderdale, Florida; Lauderdale Lakes, Florida)
 The Forum (Coral Springs, Florida; Coconut Creek, Florida; Margate, Florida; North Lauderdale, Florida; Parkland, Florida)
 The Trailblazer (Davie, Florida; Cooper City, Florida; Southwest Ranches, Florida)
 The Villager (Wellington, Florida; Royal Palm Beach, Florida; Greenacres, Florida; Loxahatchee Groves, Florida; Westlake, Florida; The Acreage, Florida)
 West Boca Times (West Boca Raton, Florida)
 Orlando Sentinel (Orlando, Florida)
 El Sentinel (Orlando, Florida)
 The Virginian-Pilot (Norfolk, Virginia)
 Inside Business (Norfolk, Virginia)
 Style Weekly (Richmond, Virginia)
 AltDaily (Norfolk, Virginia)
 The Hartford Courant (Hartford, Connecticut)
ReminderNews
 The Morning Call (Allentown, Pennsylvania)
 Daily Press (Newport News, Virginia)
 The Virginia Gazette (Williamsburg, Virginia)
 The Tidewater Review
 New York Daily News (New York, New York)

Commuter tabloids
 RedEye (Chicago, Illinois)
 Tribune News Service

Magazines
 City & Shore Magazine
 Chicago Magazine
 Hartford Magazine
 Naperville Magazine
 Polo Equestrian of the Palm Beaches
 Prime Magazine
 South Florida Parenting
 Williamsburg Magazine

Websites
 The Daily Meal
 The Active Times
 Military News
 Metromix
 Pro Soccer USA

Syndication agency
 Tribune Content Agency

Former
 AM New York (New York, New York; 2003–2008)
 Newsday (Melville, New York; 2000–2008)
 8 community weeklies
Hoy (Los Angeles and San Diego (with an edition in north Baja California), California; 2000−2018)
 Los Angeles Times (Los Angeles, California; 2000–2018)
 Daily Pilot (Newport Beach, California)
 Burbank Leader (Burbank, California)
 Glendale News Press (Glendale, California)
 La Canada Valley Sun (La Canada Flintridge, California)
 San Diego Union-Tribune (San Diego, California; 2015–2018)
 8 community weeklies

References

External links
 

 
Newspaper companies of the United States
Newspaper companies in Chicago
Companies based in Chicago
Chicago Tribune
Publishing companies established in 1847
1847 establishments in Illinois
Publishing companies established in 2014
Companies formerly listed on the Nasdaq
2014 establishments in Illinois
American companies established in 2014
Corporate spin-offs
2021 mergers and acquisitions